The simple-station Calle 19 is part of the TransMilenio mass-transit system of Bogotá, Colombia, opened in the year 2000.

Location
The station is located in the heart of the city, specifically Avenida Caracas between Calles 17 and 19.

History

In the year 2000, phase one of the TransMilenio system was opened between Portal de la 80 and Tercer Milenio, including this station.

The station gets the name Calle 19 due to its proximity to that street.

The station serves the La Capuchina, La Favorita, and Alameda neighborhoods.

Four months after the opening of the TransMilenio, during the national strike of April 9, 2001, the first attacks against the system occurred. The stations Calle 22 and Calle 19 were destroyed by stones, and some passengers suffered light wounds.

Station Services

Old trunk services

Main Line Service

Feeder routes

This station does not have connections to feeder routes.

Inter-city service

This station does not have inter-city service.

See also
Bogotá
TransMilenio
List of TransMilenio Stations

External links
TransMilenio
suRumbo.com

TransMilenio